Clemente Fernández López (23 November 1919 – 17 July 1996), known simply as Clemente, was a Spanish professional footballer who played as a right back.

Club career
Having begun his career as a midfielder, Clemente joined hometown club Real Madrid in 1942 from local amateurs CD Deportivo Castilla, playing in only four La Liga games in his first season. After one year on loan at Hércules CF he returned to the Merengues, but appeared in just seven league matches during the campaign.

Of the following seven seasons, Clemente managed to be regularly played in four of them, winning three major titles including two Copa del Rey trophies. In 1952, after 144 official games with Real Madrid, he signed for fellow league side Deportivo de La Coruña, retiring at the end of the campaign at the age of 33.

International career
Clemente earned three caps for Spain, in slightly less than one year. His debut came on 21 March 1948 in a 2–0 friendly win with Portugal, in Madrid.

Honours
Real Madrid
Copa del Generalísimo: 1946, 1947
Copa Eva Duarte: 1946

External links

1919 births
1996 deaths
Footballers from Madrid
Spanish footballers
Association football defenders
La Liga players
Real Madrid CF players
Hércules CF players
Deportivo de La Coruña players
Spain international footballers